Chinese people in the Netherlands form one of the largest overseas Chinese populations in continental Europe. In 2018 official statistics showed 92,644 people originating from the People's Republic of China (PRC) (including Hong Kong) and Republic of China (ROC), or people with at least one such parent. However, these statistics do not capture the whole size of the Chinese community, which since its earliest days has included not just migrants from China, but people of Chinese ethnicity drawn from among overseas Chinese communities as well.

Migration history
Early Chinese labour migration to the Netherlands was drawn primarily from two sources: peddlers from Qingtian, Zhejiang who began arriving in the country after World War I, and seamen of Guangdong origin drawn from among the British Chinese community; the latter had initially been brought in as strikebreakers in 1911. Their numbers dropped as a result of voluntary outmigration and deportations; by World War II, fewer than 1,000 remained.

Another group of early ethnic Chinese in the Netherlands were students; they were largely not from China, however, but were instead drawn from among Chinese communities in the Dutch East Indies. From a group of 20 in 1911, their numbers continued to increase, interrupted only by World War II; in 1957, out of the roughly 1,400 ethnic Chinese from Indonesia in the Netherlands, 1,000 were students. In 1911, these students established the Chung Hwa Hui, which was in contact with various Chinese organizations and political parties in Europe. Largely of Peranakan origin, the students tended to speak Indonesian local languages as their mother tongues, and had already done their early education at Dutch-medium schools. However, with increasing tensions in Indonesia–Netherlands relations in the late 1950s and early 1960s, the number of students dropped off sharply.

Though the number of Chinese students from Indonesia dropped off, tens of thousands of ethnic Chinese were forced to leave the country due to the violent political situation in Indonesia in 1965. Most went to China, the United States, or Australia, but those who had been educated in Dutch preferentially chose the Netherlands as their destination; there are no exact statistics, but the migrants themselves estimate that about 5,000 arrived during this period. As with the students, these migrants tended to speak no Chinese, with Indonesian languages as their mother tongues and Dutch as their academic language. In the late 1970s and early 1980s, Hong Kong also became a significant source of Chinese migrants to the Netherlands, with about 600 to 800 per year, falling off to around 300 to 400 per year by the late 1980s.

Also in the 1980s, the Netherlands began to become a popular choice for students from mainland China. Factors which influenced this popularity included the tuition fees, which were relatively lower than those in the United Kingdom, and the ease of obtaining a student visa as compared to the United States. In the beginning, these were PRC government-financed students, consisting of top students selected by examination, and gained admission at prestigious Dutch universities such as Leiden University. However, in the 1990s, more privately financed students, students on Dutch scholarships, and short-term exchange students began to arrive. By 2002, embassy figures showed roughly 4,000 PRC students in the Netherlands.

Demographic characteristics
, figures from the Netherlands' Centraal Bureau voor de Statistiek showed:
Persons born outside of the Netherlands:
41,533 mainland China-born persons (19,466 men, 22,067 women)
9,757 Hong Kong-born persons (4,808 men, 4,949 women)
83 Macau-born persons (31 men, 52 women)
2,254 Taiwan-born persons (830 men, 1,424 women)
Persons born in the Netherlands:
17,564 persons with at least one parent born in China (9,002 men, 8,562 women)
8,440 persons with at least one parent born in Hong Kong (4,300 men, 4,140 women)
36 persons with at least one parent born in Macau (18 men, 18 women)
531 persons with at least one parent born in Taiwan (273 men, 258 women)
Totalling 80,198 persons. This represents growth of 92.8% compared to the population in 1996, the earliest year for which statistics are available. However, the various groups within the population show sharply differing growth trends. The number of persons of mainland Chinese background grew by 152% over that same period, with both overseas-born and Dutch-born segments showing a similar level of growth. In contrast, the number of persons of Hong Kong background has shown only mild growth, entirely due to natural increase rather than additional migration; in fact the stock of Hong Kong migrants fell by 5.6% during the same period.

There is also migration of Surinamese Hakkas to the Netherlands who constitute about 10% of the Chinese population.

The Chinese in the Netherlands are not particularly geographically concentrated; more than half work in the restaurant trade, and because they prefer to open Chinese restaurants where they have less competition, they tend to spread out to towns all over the country. Amsterdam has a Chinatown, but it is purely a commercial district, rather than a mixed-use residential/commercial district as in Chinatowns in other countries. Rotterdam and The Hague also have similar districts.

Integration and community

Chinese students themselves, comparing the Netherlands to the United States, state that the Netherlands offers a peaceful and not-particularly-challenging life, but fewer opportunities; one popular saying among them is that excellent students find the Netherlands too small to fulfill their ambitions, and leave of their own volition, while average and below-average students are forced out of the country entirely.

Chinese in the Netherlands are often perceived to be "snakeheads", participating in smuggling Chinese migrants from Eastern Europe to the United Kingdom. In the 1980s, the Dutch government, considering the poor Dutch language abilities and lack of integration by many members of the Chinese community, began to consider officially recognising them as a disadvantaged minority, similar to Moroccan or Turkish migrants. This proved to be extremely controversial among the Chinese community; the widespread discussions in Dutch media of the problems in the community led to public perception of the Chinese as illegal migrants working for low pay and incapable of solving their own community problems, strongly embarrassing members of older generations who had stressed "invisibility and self-reliance". In the end, the government did not grant the Chinese official minority status as the Chinese did not want government subsidies and minority status. However, stereotypical mainstream views only strengthened, especially as a result of several heavily publicised tragedies such as the 2000 Dover incident, in which 58 Chinese migrants suffocated in a refrigerated container on their way from the Netherlands to Dover, England.

There are also some intra-community tensions between recent expatriates, especially students, and the older overseas Chinese. The latter are largely Cantonese-speaking, while the former use Mandarin as their lingua franca. The divide shows up most clearly in the education of children; few international students send their children to the schools established by the old overseas Chinese, deriding them as low-quality schools "for the children of the restaurant families" and employing low-quality teachers. In contrast, the old overseas Chinese describe the students as arrogant, and view themselves as the "real representatives of the Chinese community in the Netherlands".

The descendants of Indonesian-speaking Chinese tend to stay out of such conflict; having largely entered the liberal professions  they also look down on the "restaurant Chinese", but in return other Chinese often view them as not "really Chinese". They rarely join any of the associations set up by other Chinese migrants or their descendants, instead preferring their own associations.

Notable individuals
 Calvin Jong-a-Pin
 Cerezo Fung a Wing
 Etienne Shew-Atjon
 Ricardo Moniz
 Tahith Chong

See also
 Pao An Tui
 Chinese Indonesians
 China–Netherlands relations

References

Notes

Sources

Klaas Stutje, 'The Complex World of the Chung Hwa Hui: International Engagements of Chinese Indonesian Peranakan Students in the Netherlands, 1918-1931.' Bijdragen tot de Taal-, Land- en Volkenkunde/Journal of the Humanities and Social Sciences of Southeast Asia 171.4 (2015): 516-542.

Further reading

External links
The Chinese of Amsterdam, a webpage from the International Institute of Social History

Asian diaspora in the Netherlands
 
Ethnic groups in the Netherlands
Netherlands
Chinese diaspora in Europe